OCBC Wing Hang Bank Limited, formerly Wing Hang Bank Limited is a licensed bank with its head office in Hong Kong, where it is the eighth biggest bank by total assets. Since end of July 2014 Wing Hang Bank has been a subsidiary of Oversea-Chinese Banking Corporation  (OCBC) of Singapore. The acquisition of Wing Hang has given OCBC a network of about 70 branches spanning Hong Kong, Macau and mainland China to add to OCBC's existing operations in Hong Kong and China.

History 

Mr Y K Fung established Wing Hang Ngan Ho in 1937 in Canton to engage in money changing. Its early years were difficult due to the turbulent political and economic conditions in China. In 1941, the firm established a subsidiary, Banco Weng Hang, in Macau.

In 1945 Wing Hang Ngan Ho re-established itself in Hong Kong with a capital of HK$300,000 and a staff of 19. The firm prospered during the post-war boom and in 1960 incorporated as Wing Hang Bank.

In 1973 the Irving Trust Company of New York acquired a majority interest in Wing Hang and the partnership provided
the Bank with a stronger financial base and the expertise of a major international bank. In 1979 the Head Office
Building was re-developed and provided much needed modern facilities for its operations.

In 1989 Irving Trust Company merged with The Bank of New York. In July 1993, Wing Hang Bank listed its shares on the Hong Kong Stock Exchange. In August 2004, Wing Hang completed the merger with Chekiang First Bank, a local bank noted for its solid credit history and high quality portfolio. This acquisition provided the Bank with a greater scale and coverage in the market. In January 2007, the Bank acquired Inchroy Credit Corporation, a major financial institution engaged in the hire purchase and lease financing business.

In July 2007, The Bank of New York Company Inc. merged with Mellon Financial Corporation to form The Bank of
New York Mellon Corporation. That same year Wing Hang established Wing Hang Bank (China).

Acquisition by OCBC
Singapore's OCBC Bank acquired Wing Hang in 2014 for $6.23 billion SGD. Under the Hong Kong Companies Ordinance, OCBC Bank, with 97.52 percent of Wing Hang's shares, compulsorily acquired the bank on 29 July 2014. Wing Hang was subsequently delisted after the acquisition was completed.

On 1 October 2014, Wing Hang Bank was re-branded as OCBC Wing Hang to reflect its integration into the OCBC family.

Management

Board of Directors
The board comprises the chairman, 3 executive directors, 2 non-executive directors and 3 non-executive independent directors.

 Chairman: Dr Fung Yuk Bun Patrick
 Executive directors:
 Ms Au-Yeung Lai Ling Ivy Chief Executive
 Non-executive directors
 Mr Samuel Tsien
 Ms Wong Pik Kuen Helen
 Non-executive independent directors
 Mr Chim Wai Kin 
 Dr Khoo Cheng Hoe Andrew
 Mr Ooi Sang Kuang 
 Mr Soon Tit Koon

Operations
OCBC Wing Hang Bank is the holding company and the principal operating company of the Group. It provides a comprehensive range of banking and related financial services through the holding bank and its subsidiaries in Hong Kong and China.

In its Hong Kong operations, it runs 5 wealth management centres and a network of branches across Hong Kong. There are 10 branches in Hong Kong island, 12 in Kowloon and 7 in New Territories, making a total of 29 branches.

Its wholly owned subsidiary, OCBC Wing Hang Bank (China) has a network of branches in Shenzhen, Guangzhou, Shanghai, Beijing, Chengdu and Zhuhai. The Group's subsidiary in Macao operates under the name Banco Weng Hang, and has an extensive branch network there. In addition, through its other subsidiaries and affiliated companies the Group provides nominee, deposit taking, offshore banking, hire purchase, consumer financing, insurance and share brokerage services.

Subsidiaries 

 Banco OCBC Weng Hang, S.A.
 Honfirst Investment Ltd.
 OCBC Wing Hang Bank (China) Ltd.
 OCBC Wing Hang Bank (Nominees) Ltd.
 Wing Hang Bank (Trustee) Ltd.
 OCBC Wing Hang Credit Ltd.
 Wing Hang Finance Co. Ltd.
 OCBC Wing Hang Insurance Agency Ltd.
 OCBC Wing Hang Insurance Brokers Ltd.
 OCBC Wing Hang Shares Brokerage Co. Ltd.
 Inchroy Credit Corporation Ltd.

References 

Other references

 Feng, Bangyan; (2002). A Century of Hong Kong Financial Development. Joint Publishing Hong Kong. .

External links 

ocbcwhhk.com
ocbcwhmac.com
ocbc.com.cn

Companies formerly listed on the Hong Kong Stock Exchange
Banks of Hong Kong
Banks of Macau
Banks established in 1937
2014 mergers and acquisitions
OCBC Bank